Antoinette Wilhelmina (Anne-Wil) Lucas-Smeerdijk (born 10 January 1975) is a Dutch politician. As a member of the People's Party for Freedom and Democracy she was a member of the House of Representatives from 17 June 2010 to 7 September 2016. She was replaced by Daniël van der Ree. Lucas focused on matters of higher education, science and the flood control in the Netherlands.

Lucas studied urban planning at Wageningen University.

Electoral history

References 
 Parlement.com biography

External links 
 Anne-Wil Lucas personal website 
 House of Representatives biography 
 People's Party for Freedom and Democracy website 

1975 births
Living people
Dutch engineers
Dutch urban planners
Members of the House of Representatives (Netherlands)
People from Warnsveld
People's Party for Freedom and Democracy politicians
Wageningen University and Research alumni
21st-century Dutch politicians
21st-century Dutch women politicians